Hendrikus Antonius "Henk" Zanoli (21 April 1923 – 9 December 2015) was a Dutch lawyer and member of the Dutch resistance during World War II, who was awarded the honorific title Righteous Among the Nations, but returned his medal after an Israeli air strike killed six of his family members.

Zanoli was born in Laren in 1923. During the war, the Zanoli family were involved in the resistance. In 1943, when Zanoli's father had already been arrested by the German occupiers, Zanoli himself smuggled the young Jewish boy Elhanan Pinto from Amsterdam to Eemnes. With his mother Jans, Zanoli kept Pinto in hiding for the rest of the war. While the rest of Pinto's family were killed in the Holocaust, he survived to reach age 72 before dying in Jerusalem in 2007. The resistance work cost Zanoli's father and brother-in-law their lives, while his Jewish sister-in-law was deported and never returned.

In 2011, the State of Israel awarded the mother  of Zanoli with the Righteous Among the Nations medal. In 2014, at age 91, Zanoli returned the medal to Israel after an Israeli air strike killed six family members who were living in Gaza; these people were in-laws of his grandniece, a diplomat, who is married to a Palestinian economist.

References

1923 births
2015 deaths
Dutch resistance members
Dutch Righteous Among the Nations
People from Laren, North Holland